"We Laughed" is a three-track single by English musician Billy Bragg as part of the Rosetta Life project. The single was released in 2005 in the UK and peaked at No. 11. It also reached No. 38 in Ireland in 2006. For the three songs on the single, Bragg collaborated with three patients of Trimar Hospice in Weymouth, who each wrote lyrics based on their illness and feelings. The songs were produced by English guitarist Robbie McIntosh.

Background
The "We Laughed" single was created through the Rosetta Life organisation, which collaborates with professional artists, enabling people with life-threatening illnesses to express themselves using various types of creative outlets, including writing, music, drama and dance. The organisation's Rosetta Requiem focuses on music in particular.

The three tracks developed from Bragg's songwriting workshops at Weymouth's Trimar Hospice in February–March 2005. After the songs were written, Bragg recorded them with local musicians in June. At the time, Billy Bragg described working with the three women: 

In a 2005 BBC article based on the song, Bragg spoke of meeting the patients who co-wrote the tracks for the single: 

Upon release, the single was well-received critically. "We Laughed" was first aired on Jeremy Vine's BBC Radio 2 programme on 20 September. Many listeners contacted the show to find out how they could get a copy of the song. With no commercial backing, the song was reliant on free promotion and word-of-mouth recommendations. The single reached No. 11 in the UK, spending five weeks on the chart. After a final chart appearance at No. 57 on 10 December, the song briefly re-appeared in the Top 200 on 14 January 2006, placed at No. 199. In Ireland, the song reached No. 38 in March 2006, spending two weeks on the chart.

In a January 2010 interview for The Guardian, Bragg was asked if there was anything he regretted looking back on his career. He replied: "Yes. A few years ago I worked on a record called "We Laughed" with some incredible women in a hospice. We got the single to No. 11 in the charts. But now that those women are no longer with us, I sometimes wonder whether I could have done more for them."

The singer on the tracks, Helena Eden (officially credited on the single as Helena), would also record a solo acoustic version of "We Laughed" for her solo album, as well as a live version that appeared on her live album Feels Like Coming Home (The Live Sessions).

Promotion
In April 2005, the first performance of "We Laughed" featured Bragg solely performing the song to an audience of patients, hospice staff and volunteers at the Trimar Hospice. In 2006, the song was performed by the Rosetta Life band on The Late, Late, Show in Ireland.

Songs

We Laughed
We Laughed was written by Bragg and Maxine Edgington. The song was inspired by a photograph of Maxine with her teenage daughter Jessica.

For the Rosetta Requiem website, Edgington described the photograph that was the inspiration of the song: 

Speaking on writing the lyrics, Edgington said: 

In a BBC article based on the single, Edgington revealed: "I actually wrote 30 pages of all my feelings, and my emotions and what I felt, and from that I felt I had a whole balance come into my life. Yes, there were many things I had regrets about but there were an enormous amount of things I wanted to revisit, do again because they were such good fun... I understood that death wasn't just about me."

The Light Within
The Light Within was written by Bragg and Lisa Payne. In the lyrics, Payne described the inner strength she discovered through her illness.

For the Rosetta Requiem website, Payne described working on the song: 

Speaking of the song, Payne commented: "It was scary when I first heard it, I couldn't quite believe it. It expressed what I felt and the upbeat music suited the words and the way I've been tackling the illness. I'm not too bothered about it being on the CD, I care more about it pleasing my family and helping other people."

My Guiding Star
My Guiding Star is by Bragg and Veronica Barfoot. The song was inspired by Barfoot's husband and their strengthened relationship since he became her carer. Since her illness, the couple had retaken their wedding vows.

For the Rosetta Requiem website, Barfoot commented:

Track listing
CD Single
"We Laughed (Full Length)" - 4:34
"The Light Within" - 3:02
"My Guiding Star" - 3:25

Chart performance

Personnel
 Helena - vocals
 Billy Bragg - acoustic rhythm guitar
 Robbie McIntosh - guitar, percussion, producer
 Julie Lewis - piano
 Chris Lonergan - bass
 Ady Milward - drums
 Mike Hallett - engineer

References

2005 singles
Billy Bragg songs
Songs written by Billy Bragg
Charity singles